USCGC Katmai Bay (WTGB-101) is a United States Coast Guard Cutter, and the lead ship of the Bay-class of icebreaking tugboats.  At , she is designed to have greater multi-mission capabilities than the 110' Calumet-class Harbor Tug (WYTM). She is homeported in Sault Ste Marie, Michigan,
operating in support of the much larger .

Design
Katmai Bay, namesake of an area of saltwater shoreline in the Katmai National Park and Preserve of Alaska, is the lead ship of a class of icebreaking tugboats designed to have greater multi-mission capabilities than the 110' Calumet-class Harbor Tug (WYTM). The most significant differences include greater horsepower, greater speed, longer range, increased ice-breaking capability, hull lubrication system, greater degree of automation, and better habitability.

Trials were conducted in Whitefish Bay, Lake Superior, Michigan which determined that the ship has a tactical diameter of approximately three ship lengths when using 30 degrees rudder and that the ship could stop in 40 seconds with a reach of four ship lengths from an approach speed of  when ordering full astern power.

Deployment
Katmai Bay is stationed at Sault Ste. Marie, Michigan.

References

External links

Bay-class icebreaking tugs
1979 ships
Ships built by Tacoma Boatbuilding Company